KANT is a computer algebra system for mathematicians interested in algebraic number theory, performing sophisticated computations in algebraic number fields, in global function fields, and in local fields.  KASH is the associated command line interface.  They have been developed by the Algebra and Number Theory research group of the Institute of Mathematics at Technische Universität Berlin under the project leadership of Prof. Dr Michael Pohst. Kant is free for non-commercial use.

See also 
 List of computer algebra systems

References

External links
 
 Introduction to KASH3, The KANT Group

Computer algebra system software for Linux
Computer algebra systems
Proprietary freeware for Linux